Bruneau is an unincorporated community in Owyhee County in the southwestern part of the U.S. state of Idaho. The mouth of the Bruneau River is to the northwest and Bruneau Sand Dunes State Park is to the east. As of 2014, Bruneau has a population of 552.

History
Bruneau's population was 105 in 1909, and was estimated at 200 in 1960.

Geography

Climate
According to the Köppen Climate Classification system, Bruneau has a semi-arid climate, abbreviated "BSk" on climate maps. Its winters are short and mild, and summers are hot and dry.

Highways
State Highway 51 northbound crosses the Snake River and continues to Mountain Home in Elmore County; southbound it becomes Nevada Route 225 at the border and continues to Elko. State Highway 78 heads northwest within Owyhee County to Grand View, Murphy, and Marsing. Eastbound SH-78 crosses the Snake River and links through Hammett to Interstate 84.

References

External links
Untraveled Road.com - photos - Bruneau, Idaho - 2008-06-12

Unincorporated communities in Owyhee County, Idaho
Unincorporated communities in Idaho
Boise metropolitan area